Axaxacualco is a town in the Mexican state of Guerrero, located in the municipality of Eduardo Neri.

References

Populated places in Guerrero